Beaches (also known as Forever Friends) is a 1988 American comedy-drama film adapted by Mary Agnes Donoghue and based on Iris Rainer Dart's 1985 novel of the same name. It was directed by Garry Marshall, and stars Bette Midler, Barbara Hershey, Mayim Bialik, John Heard, James Read, Spalding Gray, and Lainie Kazan.

Despite generally negative reviews from critics, the film was a commercial success, grossing $59 million in the box office.

A sequel, based on the 1991 novel Beaches II: I'll Be There was planned with Barbara Eden but never filmed.

Plot
Middle-aged Cecilia Carol "C.C." Bloom, a New York actress and singer, receives a note during a rehearsal for her upcoming Los Angeles concert. She leaves in a panic to travel to the side of her friend Hillary Whitney, a San Francisco heiress and lawyer. Unable to get a flight to San Francisco because of fog, she rents a car and drives overnight, reflecting on her lifelong friendship with Hillary.

Hillary and C.C. met in 1958, under the boardwalk on the beach in Atlantic City, New Jersey. Hillary is lost and C.C. is hiding from her overbearing stage mother. They become fast friends, growing up and bonding through letters of support to each other. Hillary becomes a human rights lawyer, while C.C.'s singing career does not exactly take off. Hillary shows up at the New York City dive bar where C.C. is performing, their first meeting since Atlantic City. She moves in with C.C. and gets a job with the ACLU. C.C. is now performing singing telegrams, leading to a job offer from John, the artistic director of the Falcon Players, after she sings his birthday telegram.

A love triangle ensues as Hillary and John are instantly attracted to one another, leaving C.C. resenting her best friend. Hillary and John sleep together on the opening night of C.C.'s first lead role in an off-Broadway production. When Hillary returns home to care for her ailing father, the two friends resolve their issues about John, as John does not have romantic feelings for C.C. After her father passes away, Hillary spends time at her family beach house with lawyer Michael Essex, eventually marrying him. C.C. and John spend a lot of time together, start dating and eventually marry. Hillary and Michael travel to New York to see C.C. perform on Broadway, where she has become a star. When C.C. finds out that Hillary has stopped working as a lawyer, she accuses her of giving up on her dreams. Hillary responds that C.C. has become obsessed with her career. After the argument, Hillary ignores C.C.'s letters, throwing herself into being a dutiful, but unchallenged, wife.

John tells C.C. that her self-centeredness and obsession with her career have him feeling left behind, and he asks for a divorce. C.C. turns to her mother for advice. Her mother tells her that she has given up a lot for her daughter, and C.C. starts to understand when her mother tells her the effect that her selfishness has had on those closest to her.

Hillary discovers her husband is having an affair. When Hillary learns that C.C. is performing in San Francisco, she makes contact for the first time in years. They learn of each other's divorces, then discover that they have been secretly jealous of each other for years: Hillary is upset that she has none of C.C.'s talent or charisma, while C.C. admits she has always been envious of Hillary's beauty and intelligence.

Hillary tells C.C. that she is pregnant, and has already decided to raise the child as a single parent. This wins her admiration from the feisty and independent C.C., who promises to stay and help her out. C.C. starts talking of settling down, and having a family of her own, having become engaged to Hillary's obstetrician. However, when C.C.'s agent calls with the perfect comeback gig for her, C.C. abandons her fiancé, and races back to New York City. Hillary gives birth to a daughter, whom she names Victoria Cecilia. When Victoria is a young girl, Hillary develops viral cardiomyopathy, requiring a heart transplant. Having a rare tissue type, she realizes she will most likely die before a heart is found.

C.C. has become a big star, having won a Tony award, and completed her latest hit album. When she learns of Hillary's illness, she accompanies Hillary and Victoria to the beach house for the summer. Hillary becomes depressed due to her debilitated state, and takes her frustration out on C.C. whom she sees having fun with and connecting with Victoria. Hillary eventually begins to accept her prognosis bravely, appreciating her time with Victoria and C.C. Hillary and Victoria return to San Francisco, while C.C. heads to Los Angeles for a concert. Hillary collapses and is found by her daughter, leading to the note C.C. receives that prompts her to leave her rehearsal. C.C. takes Hillary and Victoria to the beach house, where Hillary dies.

After the funeral, C.C. takes custody of Victoria, and the two console each other in their grief. C.C. goes forward with her concert and concludes it by singing "The Glory of Love", the first song Hillary heard her sing 30 years ago; as the song ends, C.C. tearfully waves toward the sky, in tribute to her. After the show, she leaves hand-in-hand with Victoria and begins telling stories of when she first met her mother.

Cast
 Bette Midler as Cecilia Carol "C.C." Bloom
 Mayim Bialik as 11-year-old Cecilia Carol "C.C." Bloom
 Barbara Hershey as Hillary Whitney
 Marcie Leeds as 11-year-old Hillary Whitney
 John Heard as John Pierce
 Spalding Gray as Dr. Richard Milstein
 James Read as Michael Essex
 Lainie Kazan as Leona Bloom
 Grace Johnston as Victoria Essex
 Lynda Goodfriend as Mrs. Myandowski
 Tracy Reiner as Department Store Clerk
 Jenifer Lewis as Diva
 Joe Grifasi as Otto Titsling
 Phil Leeds as Sammy Pinkers
 Frank Campanella as Doorman
 Kathleen Marshall as Delivery Room Nurse #1
 Barbara Marshall as I.C. U. Nurse #2
 Scott Marshall as Car Rental Agent
 Héctor Elizondo as Judge
 Garry Marshall as Audition Director
 Marc Shaiman as Pianist

Production

The beach house scenes were filmed at cottage #13 in what is now the Crystal Cove Historic District in Crystal Cove State Park in California.

Music

The film's theme song, "Wind Beneath My Wings", hit number one on the Billboard Hot 100 charts and won Grammy Awards for Record of the Year and Song of the Year in 1990.

Release

Box office
The film took in $5,160,258 during its opening weekend beginning January 21, 1989. It grossed $57,041,866 domestically.

Home media
The film was released on VHS, Betamax and laserdisc by Touchstone Home Video on August 23, 1989, with a DVD release on August 13, 2002, followed by a special-edition DVD on April 26, 2005. The film was later released in High Definition Blu-ray format on November 6, 2012.

Reception

Critical reception
On review aggregator website Rotten Tomatoes, the film holds an approval rating of 43% based on 44 critic reviews, and an average rating of 5.1/10. The consenus summarizes: "Not all great soundtracks make good movies, and Beaches lacks the wind beneath its wings." Critics almost unanimously found the film's emotional moments to be unearned, calculated, and familiar to the point of being predictable. Roger Ebert assessed that "'Beaches' lacks the spontaneity of life. This is a movie completely constructed out of other movies - out of cliches and archetypes that were old before most of the cast members were born." He found the problem was compounded by the film foreshadowing Hillary's death right from the beginning, and gave it two and a half stars. Gene Siskel called it "a much too mechanical tearjerker" and criticized the slow pace, but acknowledged that he heard some sniffling among the audience and gave it two and a half stars. Jay Boyar noted in the Orlando Sentinel, "In advance publicity for Beaches, it has been routinely referred to as a 'tear-jerker.' Though the term is sometimes used admiringly these days, doesn't it actually mean that a movie has emotional scenes in which the emotion is somehow trumped-up or unearned? This is the sort of picture in which people slap each other as they take their marriage vows, suddenly develop life-threatening diseases, and, again, have violent confrontations whenever there's a break in the action. Anything for a laugh, anything for a tear, and nothing much authentic." Similarly to Ebert, he called it "a 1940s retread", noting its use of antiquated themes like the idea that a woman must choose between being a mother and having a career.

Dave Kehr likewise stated in the Chicago Tribune that "Beaches struggles to update a 1940s formula", describing it as particularly derivative of the 1943 film Old Acquaintance. He also felt the friendship between C.C. and Hillary to be implausible and lacking in genuine warmth, and commented that "The cardinal rule of melodrama ... is that emotion must follow from situation. When that relationship is inverted, the result is sheer manipulation and blatantly false." He gave it two stars. Sheila Benson of the Los Angeles Times called it "the most shamelessly manipulative movie since they shot the dog in The Biscuit Eater." While opining that emotional manipulation isn't necessarily bad, she felt the film had failed to capture what made the novel it is adapted from such an effective tearjerker, by neglecting the essence of C.C. and Hillary's friendship and instead focusing on petty arguments between the two. However, she praised the performances of Midler and Hershey, and admitted that the film succeeded in making her cry.

Several critics remarked that the scenes of C.C. and Hillary's childhood were more emotionally convincing and enjoyable than the rest of the film, with particular praise for Mayim Bialik's performance. Midler's numerous singing performances were also frequently cited as a strong point in a mostly weak film.

The film remained poorly regarded over later decades. In reviews for the 2017 remake, The New York Times and CNN Entertainment recalled the 1988 film as, respectively, "a pastiche of 1950s tear-jerkers that was set, strangely and uncomfortably, in the 1970s and ’80s. ... a shamelessly retrograde and literal-minded soap opera with a veneer of fake feminism" and "a film that delivered a hit song and strong box-office results but is remembered mostly for its high schmaltz factor."

Accolades
Included on the soundtrack was Midler's performance of "Wind Beneath My Wings". The song won Grammys for Record of the Year and Song of the Year in 1990. The film was nominated for the Academy Award for Best Art Direction (Albert Brenner and Garrett Lewis).

The song is recognized by American Film Institute in this list:
 2004: AFI's 100 Years...100 Songs:
 "Wind Beneath My Wings" – #44

Adaptations

Television remake

Lifetime announced a remake of the film, which aired on January 22, 2017. The updated version was directed by Allison Anders with the script by Bart Barker and Nikole Beckwith, and Idina Menzel plays the role of C.C. Nia Long plays the role of Hillary alongside Menzel. The film includes the songs "Wind Beneath My Wings" and "The Glory of Love".

Stage adaptation
A musical stage adaptation has been written, based on the book by Iris Rainer Dart, with lyrics and book by Dart and Thom Thomas (book) and music by David Austin. The musical premiered at the Signature Theatre, Arlington, Virginia in February 2014. The musical was directed by Eric D. Schaeffer, with Alysha Umphress as Cee Cee Bloom and Mara Davi as Bertie White.

The musical next opened at the Drury Lane Theatre, Oakbrook, Illinois, in June 2015 (previews). Again directed by Schaeffer,  Shoshana Bean plays Cee Cee and Whitney Bashor plays Bertie. The choreographer is Lorin Latarro, with scenic design by Derek McLane, lighting design by Howell Binkley, costume design by Alejo Vietti and sound design by Kai Harada.

References

External links

 
 
 
 

1988 films
1980s buddy comedy-drama films
1980s female buddy films
1980s musical comedy-drama films
American buddy comedy-drama films
American female buddy films
American musical comedy-drama films
1980s English-language films
Films based on American novels
Films directed by Garry Marshall
Films scored by Georges Delerue
Films set in 1958
Films set in 1988
Films set in Atlantic City, New Jersey
Films set in Miami
Films set in New York City
Films set in San Francisco
Films set in the San Francisco Bay Area
Films set on beaches
Touchstone Pictures films
Tragicomedy films
1988 comedy films
1988 drama films
1980s American films